
This is a list of women philosophers ordered alphabetically by surname. Although often overlooked in mainstream historiography, women have engaged in philosophy throughout the field's history. Some notable philosophers include Maitreyi (1000 BCE), Gargi Vachaknavi (900 BCE), Ghosha (800 BCE), Hypatia of Alexandria (ca. 370–415 CE), Anne Conway (1631–1679), Mary Wollstonecraft (1759–1797), Harriet Martineau (1802-1876), Sarah Margaret Fuller (1810–1850), Frances Power Cobbe (1822-1904), Vernon Lee (1856-1935), Edith Stein (1891–1942), Ayn Rand (1905–1982), Hannah Arendt (1906–1975), Simone de Beauvoir (1908–1986), Iris Murdoch (1919–1999), Elizabeth Anscombe (1919–2001), Mary Midgley (1919–2018), Philippa Foot (1920–2010), Mary Warnock (1924–2019), Joyce Mitchell Cook (1933–2015, the first African American woman to receive a Ph.D. in philosophy), Cora Diamond (born 1937), and Susan Haack (born 1945).



By period

Ancient philosophy

Lopamudra (born 1100 BCE)
Maitreyi (born about 1000 BCE )
Ghosha  (born vedic period)
Gargi Vachaknavi (born about 700 BCE)
Theano of Croton (6th century BCE)
Aristoclea of Delphi (6th century BCE)
Khujjuttarā  (6th century BCE)
Aspasia of Miletus (approx. 470–400 BCE)
Arete of Cyrene (4th century BCE)
Hipparchia of Maroneia (4th century BCE)
Nicarete of Megara (fl. around 300 BCE)
Catherine of Alexandria (282–305)
Ptolemais of Cyrene (3rd century BCE)
Aesara of Lucania (3rd century BCE)
Diotima of Mantinea (appears in Plato's Symposium)
Ban Zhao (c. 35–100)
Sosipatra of Ephesus (4th century CE)
Xie Daoyun (before 340–after 399)
Hypatia (c. 360–415 CE)
Aedesia of Alexandria (5th century CE)
Theodora (5th-6th century CE)

Medieval philosophy
From the fall of the Western Roman Empire in the 5th century C.E. to the Renaissance in the 16th century.

Ubhaya Bharati (8th century)
Héloïse d'Argenteuil (1090–1164), contributed to the ethical thought of Peter Abelard. 
Akka Mahadevi (c.1130–1160) 
Marguerite Porete (1250–1310)
Tullia d'Aragona (c. 1510–1556)
Lalleshwari  (1320–1392)
Catherine of Siena (1347–1380)
Christine de Pizan (1364-1430)
Moderata Fonte (1555–1592)
Hildegard of Bingen (1098–1179), German abbess, composer, and philosopher.
Teresa of Ávila (1515-1582)

Modern philosophy
It is still debated when the Modern period began, but some scholars place 15th and 16th century philosophers into the category of “Early Modern Philosophy”, and those in the 17th through the early 20th centuries into the categories of Modern and “Post Modern” philosophy. 

Marie de Gournay (1565-1645)
Anna Maria van Schurman (1607-1678)
Madeleine de Scudéry (1607-1701)
Gabrielle Suchon (1631-1703)
Madame de Maintenon (1635-1719)
Mary Astell (1666–1731)     
Damaris Cudworth Masham (1659–1708), philosopher and theologian
Laura Bassi (1711–1778), philosopher and physicist
Harriet Martineau (1802-1876)
Helena Blavatsky (1831–1891)
Frances Power Cobbe (1822-1904)
Antoinette Brown Blackwell (1825–1921)
Margaret Cavendish (1623–1673)   
Émilie du Châtelet (1706–1749)
Sister Nivedita (1867–1911)
Catharine Trotter Cockburn (1679–1749)    
Anne Conway (1631–1679)      
George Eliot (Mary Ann Evans) (1819–1880) 
Elisabeth of Bohemia (1618–1680)   
Sor Juana Inés de la Cruz (1648–1695)
Mary Wollstonecraft (1759–1797)
Sophie de Grouchy (1764-1822)
Gauri Ma (1857–1938)

Contemporary philosophy

Felicia Nimue Ackerman (fl. 2014)
Marilyn McCord Adams (1943–2017)
Alia Al-Saji (fl. 2014)
Lilli Alanen (1941–2021)
Linda Martín Alcoff (born 1955)
Amy Allen (fl. 2014)
Alice Ambrose (1906–2001)
Elizabeth Anderson (born 1959)
Lou Andreas-Salomé (1861–1937)
Julia Annas (born 1946)
G. E. M. Anscombe (1919–2001)   
Louise Antony (fl. 2014)
Hannah Arendt (1906–1975), political theorist   
Nomy Arpaly (fl. 2014)
Anita Avramides (born 1952)
Babette Babich (born 1956)
Annette Baier (1929–2012)
Dorit Bar-On (fl. 1990)
Marcia Baron (fl. 2014)
Lauren Barthold
Sandra Bartky (1935–2016)
Nancy Bauer (born 1960)
Simone de Beauvoir (1908–1986), author, feminist   
Helen Beebee (fl. 2014)
Seyla Benhabib (born 1950)
Tina Fernandes Botts (fl. 2014)
Peg Birmingham (fl. 2014)
Susanne Bobzien (born 1960)
Samantha Brennan (fl. 1997)
Janet Broughton (fl. 2014)
Kimberley Brownlee (born 1978)
Teresa Blankmeyer Burke (fl. 2014)
Inga Bostad (born 1963), Norwegian philosopher and educator
Giannina Braschi (born 1953)
Judith Butler (born 1956)
Mary Whiton Calkins (1863–1930)
Joan Callahan (professor emerita, 2011)
Elisabeth Camp (fl. 2014)
Victoria Camps (1941)
Claudia Card (1940–2015)
Nancy Cartwright (born 1944)
Barbara Cassin (born 1947)
Ruth Chang (fl. 2014)
Patricia Churchland (born 1943)
Hélène Cixous (born 1937)
Lorraine Code (born 1937)
Joyce Mitchell Cook (1933–2014)
Megan Craig
Alice Crary (fl. 2014)
Ann Cudd (fl. 2014)
Chris Cuomo (fl. 2014)
Izydora Dąmbska (1904–1983)
Peggy DesAutels (fl. 2014)
Penelope Deutscher (fl. 2014)
Heather Douglas (born 1969)
Helene von Druskowitz (1856–1918)
Raya Dunayevskaya (1910–1987)
Divya Dwivedi
Dorothy Edgington (born 1941)
Frances Egan (fl. 2014)
Dorothy Emmet (1904–2000)
Cécile Fabre (born 1971)
Carla Fehr (fl. 2014)
Carrie Figdor (fl. 2014)
Gail Fine (fl. 2014)
Juliet Floyd  (fl. 2014)
Philippa Foot (1920–2010)  
Nancy Fraser (born 1947)
Marilyn Frye (born 1941)
Ann Garry (fl. 2014)
Tamar Gendler (born 1965)
Margaret Gilbert (born 1942)
Mary Louise Gill (fl. 2014)
Kathryn Gines (fl. 2014)
Lydia Goehr (fl. 2014)
Rebecca Goldstein (born 1950)
Patricia Greenspan (fl. 2014)
Celia Green (born 1935)
Germaine Greer (born 1939)
Marjorie Grene (1910–2009)
Susan Haack (born 1945)
Ruth Hagengruber (born 1958)
Käte Hamburger (1896–1992), literary scholar
Donna Haraway (born 1944)
Sandra Harding (born 1935), feminist
Sally Haslanger (fl. 2014)
Jane Heal (born 1946)
Virginia Held (born 1929)
Ágnes Heller (1929–2019)
Jeanne Hersch (1910–2000)
Mary Hesse (1924–2016)
Pamela Hieronymi (fl. 2014)
Jennifer Hornsby (born 1951)
Susan Hurley (1954–2007)
Rosalind Hursthouse (born 1943)
Luce Irigaray (born 1930)  
Jenann Ismael (fl. 2014)
Alison Jaggar (fl. 2014)
Susan James (born 1951)
Carrie Ichikawa Jenkins (fl. 2014)
Barbara Johnson (1947–2009)
Evelyn Fox Keller (born 1936)
Patricia Kitcher (born 1948)
Eva Kittay (fl. 2014)
Martha Klein (retired 2006)
Martha Kneale (1909–2001)
Helen Knight (1899–1984)
Sarah Kofman (1934–1994)
Christine Korsgaard (born 1952)
Julia Kristeva (born 1941)  
İoanna Kuçuradi (born 1936)
Jennifer Lackey (fl. 2014)
Susanne Langer (1895–1985)  
Rae Langton (born 1961)
Thelma Z. Lavine (1915–2011)
Michèle Le Dœuff (born 1948) 
Hilde Lindemann (fl. 2014)
Genevieve Lloyd (born 1941)
Elisabeth Lloyd
Sharon Lloyd (fl. 2014)
Helen Longino (born 1944)
Béatrice Longuenesse (born 1950)
Penelope Maddy (born 1950)
Kate Manne (born 1983)
Ruth Barcan Marcus (1921–2012) 
Noëlle McAfee  (fl. 2014)
Alison McIntyre (fl. 2014)
Margaret MacDonald (1907–1956)
Fiona Macpherson (born 1971)
Mary Kate McGowan (fl. 2014)
Susan Mendus (born 1951)
Christia Mercer (fl. 2014)
Mary Midgley (1919–2018)
Ruth Millikan (born 1933)
Michele Moody-Adams
Iris Murdoch (1919–1999) 
Nancey Murphy (born 1951)
Constance Naden (1858–1889), poet and philosopher
Jennifer Nagel (graduated 1990)
Uma Narayan (born 1958), Indian postcolonial feminist
Susan Neiman (born 1955)
Karen Ng
Nel Noddings (born 1929)
Kathryn Norlock (born 1969)
Kathleen Nott (1905–1999)
Martha Nussbaum (born 1947) 
Hilda D. Oakeley (1867–1950)
Peg O'Connor (born 1965)
Kelly Oliver (born 1958)
Onora O'Neill (born 1941) 
Maria Ossowska (1896–1974)
Adrian Piper
Ayn Rand (1905–1982)
Janet Radcliffe Richards (born 1944)
Rosemary Radford Ruether (born 1936)
Kate Raworth (born 1970)
Yvanka B. Raynova (born 1959)
Helena Roerich (1879–1955)
Amélie Rorty (1932–2020)
Renata Salecl (born 1962)
Debra Satz (fl. 2015)
Jennifer Saul (fl. 2014)
Susanna Schellenberg (born 1974)
Naomi Scheman (fl. 2014)
Londa Schiebinger (born 1952), feminist
Sally Scholz (born 1968)
Ofelia Schutte (professor emerita, 2012)
Lisa H. Schwartzman (born 1969)
Gila Sher (fl. 2014)
Nancy Sherman (fl. 2014)
Seana Shiffrin (fl. 2014)
Vandana Shiva (born 1952), feminist
Laurie Shrage (born 1953)
Susanna Siegel (fl. 2014)
Alison Simmons (born 1965)
Dorothy Smith (born 1926)
Holly Martin Smith (fl. 2014)
Nancy Snow (fl. 2014)
Miriam Solomon (fl. 2014)
Gayatri Chakravorty Spivak (born 1942)
Susanne Sreedhar (fl. 2014)
Susan Stebbing (1885–1943)
Edith Stein (1891–1942), pedagogue
Isabelle Stengers (born 1949)
Helene Stöcker (1869–1943), feminist, sexual reformer
Alison Stone (born 1972)
Eleonore Stump (born 1947), analytic thomist 
Anita Superson (fl. 2014)
Lisa Tessman
Amie Thomasson (born 1968)
Judith Jarvis Thomson (1929–2020)  
Valerie Tiberius (fl. 2014)
Lynne Tirrell (fl. 2014)
Margaret Urban Walker (fl. 2014)
Georgia Warnke (fl. 2014)
Mary Warnock, Baroness Warnock (1924–2019)
Simone Weil (1909–1943), critical marxist   
Elsie Whetnall (1897–c.1998)
Jennifer Whiting (fl. 2014)
Jessica Wilson (fl. 2014)
Margaret Dauler Wilson (1939–1998)
Charlotte Witt (born 1951)
Monique Wittig (1935–2003)
Susan Wolf (born 1952)
Ursula Wolf (born 1951)
Dorothy Maud Wrinch (1894–1976)
Alison Wylie (born 1954)
Naomi Zack (fl. 2014)
Linda Trinkaus Zagzebski (born 1946)
María Zambrano
Ewa Ziarek (fl. 2014)
Alenka Zupančič (born 1966)
Jan Zwicky (born 1955)

Alphabetically

A

Notes
 – For more information about this person's contribution to philosophy see her entry in Margaret Atherton's Women Philosophers of the Early Modern Period. Hackett; 1994. 
 – For more information about this person's contribution to philosophy see her entry in Jacqueline Broad's Women Philosophers of the Seventeenth Century. Cambridge; 2003. 
  – For more information about this person's contribution to philosophy see her entry in The Cambridge Dictionary of Philosophy. Cambridge University Press; 1999. 
  – For more information about this person's contribution to philosophy see her entry in Jane Duran's Eight Women Philosophers: Theory Politics and Feminism. University of Illinois Press; 2006. 
  – For more information about this person's contribution to philosophy see her entry in Therese Boos Dykeman's The Neglected Canon: Nine Women Philosophers – First to the Twentieth Century. Kluwer; 1999. 
  – For more information about this person's contribution to philosophy see her entry in Catherine Villanueva Gardner's Women Philosophers. Westview; 2003.  (paperback);  (hardcover)
  – For more information about this person's contribution to philosophy see her entry in The Oxford Companion to Philosophy. Oxford University Press; 1995. 
  – For more information about this person's contribution to philosophy see her entry in the Concise Routledge Encyclopedia of Philosophy. Routledge; 2000. 
  – For more information about this person's contribution to philosophy see her entry in Mary Warnock's Women Philosophers. J.M. Dent; 1996.

References

Philosophers
Women

de:Philosophin
hu:Női filozófusok listája
pt:Mulheres na filosofia